Little Pond may refer to:

Little Pond (Massachusetts), a lake in Massachusetts
Little Pond (Delaware County, New York), a lake in New York
Little Pond (Orange County, New York), a lake in New York
Little Pond, Nova Scotia, a community in Canada
Little Pond, Prince Edward Island, a community in Canada

See also
A Little Pond, a South Korean film